The Sangharaja Nikaya is a tradition of Theravada Buddhism, located in Bangladesh. 

The word Nikaya is Pali and literally means "volume". It refers to the sections of the Tipitaka. However, an alternate usage is practiced in Southeast Asia, in which the word "Nikaya" is a respectful term for a monastic community.

The community consists largely of rural Bengali Buddhists. It was formed in 1864 by Sangharaja Saramedha Mahasthavira.

Dark Ages
From the 13th to the middle of the 19th century, Bengali Buddhism underwent its own "Dark age". In this time, much cross-over between Hinduism and Buddhism occurred, such that Hindu deities such as Shiva, Lakshmi, and Durga were worshipped by Buddhists, as Buddhist deities. This went so far as to include animal sacrifice, at the time an acceptable practice in Hinduism.

Moreover, the rules of the Vinaya began to be re-interpreted and the canonical text itself more or less fell by the wayside. Monks were commonly involved in leading a household life, having families, and even serving as "matchmakers". It was under these conditions that the Sangharaj of Myanmar, Saramitra Mahasthabir, inaugurated his reform movement in the 19th century.

Arrival at Chittagong
Saramitra Mahasthabir arrived at the Chittagong province of Bangladesh in 1856 after being invited by Radha Charan Mahasthabir, an important Bengali monk. While in Bangladesh, the Sangharaj travelled between towns in order to see for himself the state of Bengali affairs. He remained in Bangladesh for a few months before returning to Myanmar.

Reform
Nine years later, in 1864, the Sangharaj returned to Chittagong at the invitation of Bengali monks. Arriving with an entourage of his own students, the Sangharaj began his reform movement within the Sangha. He chastised monks for following practices that the Vinaya clearly outlaws, such as animal sacrifice, using of money, maintaining a family, drinking alcohol, and eating food (especially meat) not offered. He also attacked the practice of ordaining monks below the age of 20 - full ordination is only available to those over the age of twenty. Likewise, he attacked the laxity in the order which allowed those who clearly were not suited to the religious life to remain. 

After his efforts to reform the Sangha, the Sangharaj turned his attention toward lay practice and spoke against animal sacrifice and the worship of gods. 

Saramitra Mahasthabir became highly influential and persuaded a growing number of monks to be re-ordained as a gesture of their adherence to the reform movement. 

This movement to re-ordain under the auspices of a "Buddhist Reformation" marked the beginning of what has now become the Sangharaj Nikaya. Saramitra Mahasthabir performed upasampada for a group of seven monks at Pahartali-Mahamuni, and this initial group of eight began to rapidly expand. 

With a new nikaya under his authority, the Sangharaj became highly effective at eliminating the worship of gods and the practice of tantra.

Opposition
An anti-reformation movement came into being in order to counter-act that which was led by Saramitra Mahasthabir. This movement became known as the Mahasthabir Nikaya and was led by none other than Radha Charan Mahasthabir, the Bengali monk who first invited Saramitra Mahasthabir to Bangladesh. 

It's important to note, however, that the Mahasthabir did not oppose the Sangharaj on doctrinal grounds - they did not advocate the practices the Sangharaj Nikaya attempted to eradicate. In point of fact, they are doctrinally identical to the Sangharaj Nikaya. However, the Mahasthabir Nikaya believed that a Bengali Buddhist order should not come under a powerful influence from a foreign entity. They opposed the Sangharaj Nikaya on the grounds that the Sangharaj Nikaya was foreign in origin, not on the grounds that the Sangharaj Nikaya was degenerate.  Differences between the lineages are purely practical, i.e., they advocate different day-to-day practices for their monks. As such, differences are extremely minimal, and important only to the monastic sangha. Laity following the different traditions did not particularly differentiate between the two. The distinction served only to maintain an organizational front, not a doctrinal opposition.

See also
 Theravāda Buddhism
 Bengali Buddhists
 Mahasthabir Nikaya

Theravada Buddhist orders
Schools of Buddhism founded in Bangladesh